{{Infobox person
| name               = Sunanda Sharma
| image              = Sunanda Sharma (singer).jpg
| image_size         = 
| caption            = Sharma in 2019
| birth_name         =
| birth_date         = 
| birth_place        = Fatehgarh Churian, Punjab, India
| nationality        = Indian
| citizenship        = Indian
| alma_mater         = 
| occupation         = 
| known_for          = 
| notable_works      = Patake  (song), Morni, Sandal, Jaani Tera Naa, Duji Vaar Pyar,Pagal Nahi Hona, Baarish ki jaye"
| style              = 
| parents            = 
| awards             = 
| module             = 
| net_worth          = 
}}

Sunanda Sharma (born 30 January 1992) is an Indian playback singer and film actress. She made her debut with the song "Billi Akh". Sharma began her acting career with the film Sajjan Singh Rangroot''  with co-stars Diljit Dosanjh and Yograj Singh. Sunanda started her Bollywood career with "Tere Naal Nachna" song.

Career
Sunanda Sharma started her career by singing cover songs and uploading video recordings to YouTube. After growing in popularity, she eventually released her debut single, "Billi Akh". One of her songs “Jaani Tera Naa”, released in 2017, has been viewed over 334 million times on YouTube.

She won Best Debut Female Vocalist at PTC Punjabi Music Awards. In 2017 she won Best Female Act at the Brit Asia TV Music Awards. "Baarish Ki Jaaye" is being loved by audience around India. Sunanda Sharma was invited to host as an anchor for the show 'Hunar Punjab Da - Season 2', Telecasted on PTC Punjabi Channel. Sunanda Sharma is being known as the New Boss Lady of the Music Industry of India.

Discography

Singles

Films

Filmography

Films

Music videos

References

External links

 
 
 

Living people
1992 births
Gurdaspur